Jerry Lott, also known as Marty Lott and The Phantom (January 30, 1938 – September 4, 1983) was an American rockabilly singer.

Life and career
Lott was born Jerry Lottis in Prichard, Alabama, and grew up in Leakesville, Mississippi. During his early performing career, he often called himself "Marty". According to a 1980 interview, he played country music until 1956, when Elvis Presley "turned his head around".

He recorded "Love Me" and the ballad "Whisper My Love" in 1958, and persuaded Pat Boone to listen to the demo. Boone had the idea of the unknown calling himself The Phantom after the comics character and wearing a mask, and Dot released the single, Dot 45–16056, in January 1960. The songwriting credit for both is M. Lott.

"Love Me" is distinct from the song "Love Me" recorded by Elvis in 1956. Lott said in the interview that he went into the studio after working for months on "Whisper Your Love" but without a song for the other side of the record, and "[s]omeone suggested I wrote something like Elvis ... 'See if you spark rock 'n' roll a little bit'". On the second take, the one that was used, he "blew one of the controls off the wall". The song was rerecorded by The Blue Cats in 1981 for their second LP. 'Love Me' was also covered by The Cramps and The Bananamen, a side project of British Rockabilly band The Sting-rays.

Lott was paralyzed in a car accident in 1966 in Spartanburg, South Carolina, and died in 1983 at the age of 46.

References

External links
"Phantom" at Rockin' Country Style

1983 deaths
1938 births
20th-century American singers
American rockabilly musicians
People from Prichard, Alabama